Fatma Begum (1892–1983) was an Indian actress, director, and screenwriter. She is often considered the first female film director of Indian cinema. Within four years, she went on to write, produce and direct many films. She launched her own production house, Fatma Films, which later became Victoria-Fatma Films, and directed her first film, Bulbul-e-Paristan, in 1926.

Family

Fatma Begum was born into an Urdu-speaking Muslim family in India. Fatma Begum was supposedly married to Nawab Sidi Ibrahim Muhammad Yakut Khan III of Sachin State.  However, there is no record of a marriage or contract having taken place between the Nawab and Fatma Bai or of the Nawab having recognised any of her children as his own, a prerequisite for legal paternity in Muslim family law. She was the mother of silent superstars Zubeida, Sultana, and Shehzadi. She was also the grandmother of Humayun Dhanrajgir and Durreshahwar Dhanrajgir, son and daughter of Zubeida and Maharaja Narsingir Dhanrajgir of Hyderabad and Jamila Razzaq daughter of Sultana and Seth Razaaq, a prominent businessman of Karachi. She also happened to be the great-grandmother of model turned actor Rhea Pillai who is the daughter of  her grand daughter Durreshahwar Dhanrajgir.

Career
She began her career on the Urdu stage. She later shifted to films and debuted in Ardeshir Irani's silent film, Veer Abhimanyu (1922). It was common practice for men to play women in plays and movies, so she became a huge woman superstar. Fatma Begum was fair skinned and wore dark make-up that suited the sepia/black & white images on the screen. Most of the roles required wigs for the heroes as well as the heroines.

In 1926, she established Fatma Films which later became known as Victoria-Fatima Films in 1928. She became a pioneer for fantasy cinema where she used trick photography to have early special effects. She was an actress at Kohinoor Studios and Imperial Studios, while writing, directing, producing, and acting in her own films at Fatma Films.

Begum became the first female director of Indian cinema with her 1926 film, Bulbul-e-Paristan.  While no known prints of the film currently exist, the high budget production has been described as a fantasy film featuring many special effects. If true, the film places Begum among early pioneers of fantasy cinema such as George Melies. While continuing to produce and appear in her own work, Fatma worked for Kohinoor Studios and Imperial Studios until her last film in 1938, Duniya Kya Hai?

She directed many other films, her last being the Goddess of Luck in 1929.

Filmography

Legacy
She died in 1983 at the age of 91. Her legacy was carried on by her daughter Zubeida, whom besides being a silent film star, acted in India's first ever talkie, Alam Ara.

References

External links

 

Indian film actresses
Indian silent film actresses
Indian women film directors
20th-century Indian actresses
1983 deaths
20th-century Indian film directors
1892 births
Indian women screenwriters
20th-century Indian dramatists and playwrights
20th-century Indian women writers
Screenwriters from Gujarat
People from Surat district
Women writers from Gujarat
Film directors from Gujarat
Actresses from Gujarat
Indian women film producers
Indian silent film producers
Indian silent film directors
Businesswomen from Gujarat
20th-century Indian screenwriters